Rajes a/l Perumal or P. Rajes (21 July 1985 – 17 October 2022) was a Malaysian professional footballer who played as a right-back.

Career
In his early career, Rajes played for MP Selayang in the 2005 FAM League. He moved to Sabah in late 2006 and played for the Borneo based team in 2006–07 season. He signed with Selangor PKNS FC in 2008 and Shahzan Muda in 2009. He return to PKNS in 2010 and won the 2011 Malaysia Premier League title. 

He transfer to Selangor in 2014 and made his debut against T-Team on 18 January 2014 coming in as substitutes in the 79th minutes. His second and last Super League appearances for Selangor is against Sarawak where Selangor won 3–0 where he also come in as substitutes.

In 2015, he transfer to Kedah where he become a regular for the team. He made 15 league appearances in 2015 as Kedah won the Malaysia Premier League title and promoted to the Super League. Overall he made 23 appearances for Kedah in all competition.

Rajes return to PKNS in 2016 and made his third debut with PKNS in a 4–4 draw against Kuantan FA. In 2018, he signed with MISC-MIFA (now Petaling Jaya City) and made 20 league appearances in his first season. He scored his first goal for MISC-MIFA on 22 May 2018 in a 3–2 win over Penang. His last match for the club was against Kuala Lumpur City on 15 October 2022.

Death
Rajes died on 17 October 2022, after sustaining injuries due to a motorcycle accident at Batu Caves, Selangor.

Honours
PKNS
 Malaysia Premier League: 2011

Kedah
 Malaysia Premier League: 2015

References

External links
 

1985 births
2022 deaths
People from Selangor
Malaysian people of Indian descent
Malaysian footballers
Association football fullbacks
Kedah Darul Aman F.C. players
Selangor FA players
PKNS F.C. players
Petaling Jaya City FC players
21st-century Malaysian people
Road incident deaths in Malaysia 
Motorcycle road incident deaths